Narsingdi-3 is a constituency represented in the Jatiya Sangsad (National Parliament) of Bangladesh since 2019 by Zahirul Haque Bhuiyan Mohan of the Awami League.

Boundaries 
The constituency encompasses Shibpur Upazila.

History 
The constituency was created in 1984 from a Dhaka constituency when the former Dhaka District was split into six districts: Manikganj, Munshiganj, Dhaka, Gazipur, Narsingdi, and Narayanganj.

Ahead of the 2008 general election, the Election Commission redrew constituency boundaries to reflect population changes revealed by the 2001 Bangladesh census. The 2008 redistricting altered the boundaries of the constituency.

Ahead of the 2014 general election, the Election Commission reduced the boundaries of the constituency. Previously it had included three union parishads of Raipura Upazila: Daukar Char, Marjal, Uttar Bakharnagar.

Members of Parliament 
Key

Elections

Elections in the 2010s

Elections in the 2000s

Elections in the 1990s

References

External links
 

Parliamentary constituencies in Bangladesh
Narsingdi District